The Batán Grande or Sicán Archaeological Complex, just north of Chiclayo, Lambayeque Province, Peru, is an ancient archaeological site that was occupied by the Sican culture. The site has 50 identified pyramids.

The archaeological site is located in the Historic Forest Sanctuary of Pómac. It was probably built between the 8th and 12th centuries A.D.

See also
Pómac Forest Historic Sanctuary

References 

Ruins in Peru
Archaeological sites in Lambayeque Region
Archaeological sites in Peru